Wayne Boyd (born 25 October 1990) is a British racing driver from County Antrim, Northern Ireland.

Boyd won the British Formula Ford Championship in 2008 with Jamun Racing. He won 13 out of 25 championship races.  Sat on the pole for 15 races and was on the podium 20 times out of 25 races. In the same year he won the Formula Ford Festival Duratec class. His dominate performance earned him named as one of British Racing Driver Club Superstars and nominated for the BRDC McLaren Autosport Award. Boyd also won the Walter Hayes Trophy in 2014 and won the Formula Ford Festival for a second time in 2015.

In 2009 he raced full-time in the British Formula Three Championship for T-Sport and won a race at Donington Park. He started that race outside the Top 10 and in the rain raced his way to the win on slicks.  At the Macau GP, Boyd walked away from an incredible crash - surviving after landing upside down and will be remembered as a great escape. He finished 12th in points overall. He was again nominated as BRDC Superstars and British MSA Race Elite Driver.

In 2010, financial constraints only allowed him to make two one-off races Hockenheimring for Sino Vision Racing in British F3, the second was the F3 Masters event at Zandvoort in which he started 24th on the grid and finished 8th in poor weather conditions.

In 2011 Boyd signed to race for Belardi Auto Racing in the U.S. F2000 National Championship in America. The deal came together days before the start of the season. He captured two wins, including one on the oval at the Milwaukee Mile, six podiums in total and finished third in the Championship points behind Petri Suvanto and Spencer Pigot.

In 2012, Boyd raced two event weekends for Belardi Auto Racing at Baltimore and Virginia International Raceway posting a third- and second-place finish at VIR.

Early years: Boyd starting karting in September 2001 in the cadet class (Zip kart) finishing in the Top 10 in his first year in the Northern Irish Championship.  Contested the Five Nations Championship at Nutts Corner finishing 5th.  His first championships were in 2004 winning the Ulster Championship at Nutts Corner, the Five Nations Championship (NC Plate Winner). He raced for Maranello in 2005 placing 1st in the Ulster Cup and second in the Northern Ireland Karting Association.  In 2006, he stepped up to Intrepid Karts and continued placing 1st and 2nd in Ulster championships.

In 2007, Boyd raced Formula Ford 1600 and won the Northern Irish FF1600 Championship. He was named Novice of the Year.  He set new track records on his first visits to Knockhill; Mondello Park; Brands Hatch during the Formula Ford Festival and at Silverstone during the Walter Hayes Trophy.

Racing Record

U.S. F2000 National Championship

Complete 24 Hours of Le Mans results

Complete WeatherTech SportsCar Championship results
(key) (Races in bold indicate pole position; results in italics indicate fastest lap)

References

External links
 Career statistics from Driver Database
 Official Website 

1990 births
Living people
Racing drivers from Northern Ireland
Formula Ford drivers
British Formula Renault 2.0 drivers
British Formula Three Championship drivers
U.S. F2000 National Championship drivers
24 Hours of Daytona drivers
European Le Mans Series drivers
Asian Le Mans Series drivers
WeatherTech SportsCar Championship drivers
FIA World Endurance Championship drivers
24 Hours of Le Mans drivers
T-Sport drivers
Belardi Auto Racing drivers
United Autosports drivers
Hitech Grand Prix drivers
Fortec Motorsport drivers
Le Mans Cup drivers
People educated at Antrim Grammar School